Charles University (UK;), also known as Charles University in Prague or historically as the University of Prague, is the oldest and largest university in the Czech Republic. It is one of the oldest universities in Europe in continuous operation. Today, the university consists of 17 faculties located in Prague, Hradec Králové, and Plzeň. Charles University belongs among the top three universities in Central and Eastern Europe. It is ranked around 200–300 in the world.

History

Medieval university (1349–1419)
The establishment of a medieval university in Prague was inspired by Holy Roman Emperor Charles IV. He asked his friend and ally, Pope Clement VI, to do so. On 26 January 1347 the pope issued the bull establishing a university in Prague, modeled on the University of Paris, with the full (4) number of faculties, that is including a theological faculty. On 7 April 1348 Charles, the king of Bohemia, gave to the established university privileges and immunities from the secular power in a Golden Bull and on 14 January 1349 he repeated that as the King of the Romans. Most Czech sources since the 19th century—encyclopedias, general histories, materials of the university itself—prefer to give 1348 as the year of the founding of the university, rather than 1347 or 1349. This was caused by an anticlerical shift in the 19th century, shared by both Czechs and Germans.

The university was opened in 1349. The university was sectioned into parts called nations: the Bohemian, Bavarian, Polish and Saxon. The Bohemian natio included Bohemians, Moravians, southern Slavs, and Hungarians; the Bavarian included Austrians, Swabians, natives of Franconia and of the Rhine provinces; the Polish included Silesians, Poles, Ruthenians; the Saxon included inhabitants of the Margravate of Meissen, Thuringia, Upper and Lower Saxony, Denmark, and Sweden. Ethnically Czech students made 16–20% of all students. Archbishop Arnošt of Pardubice took an active part in the foundation by obliging the clergy to contribute and became a chancellor of the university (i.e., director or manager).

The first graduate was promoted in 1359. The lectures were held in the colleges, of which the oldest was named for the king the Carolinum, established in 1366. In 1372 the Faculty of Law became an independent university.

In 1402 Jerome of Prague in Oxford copied out the Dialogus and Trialogus of John Wycliffe. The dean of the philosophical faculty, Jan Hus, translated Trialogus into the Czech language. In 1403 the university forbade its members to follow the teachings of Wycliffe, but his doctrine continued to gain in popularity.

In the Western Schism, the Bohemian nation took the side of king Wenceslaus and supported the Council of Pisa (1409). The other nations of the university declared their support for the side of Pope Gregory XII, thus the vote was 1:3 against the Bohemians. Hus and other Bohemians, though, took advantage of Wenceslaus' opposition to Gregory. By the Decree of Kutná Hora on 18 January 1409, the king subverted the university constitution by granting the Bohemian masters three votes. Only a single vote was left for all other three nations combined, compared to one vote per each nation before. The result of this coup was the emigration of foreign (mostly German) professors and students, founding the University of Leipzig in May 1409. Before that, in 1408, the university had about 200 doctors and Masters, 500 bachelors, and 30,000 students ; it now lost a large part of this number, accounts of the loss varying from 5000 to 20,000  including 46 professors.

In the autumn of 1409, Hus was elected rector of the now Czech-dominated rump university. The standing of the university declined, and it became merely a regional institution with a very low status. Soon, in 1419, the faculties of theology and law disappeared, and only the faculty of arts remained in existence.

Protestant academy (1419–1622)

The faculty of arts became a centre of the Hussite movement, and the chief doctrinal authority of the Utraquists. No degrees were given in the years 1417–30; at times there were only eight or nine professors. Emperor Sigismund, son of Charles IV, took what was left into his personal property and some progress was made. The emperor Ferdinand I called the Jesuits to Prague and in 1562 they opened an academy—the Clementinum. From 1541 till 1558 the Czech humanist  (1516–1566) was a professor of Greek language. Some progress was made again when the emperor Rudolph II took up residence in Prague. In 1609 the obligatory celibacy of the professors was abolished. In 1616 the Jesuit Academy became a university. (It could award academic degrees.)

Jesuits were expelled 1618–1621 during the early stages of the Thirty Years' War, which was started in Prague by anti-Catholic and anti-Imperial Bohemians. By 1622, the Jesuits had a predominant influence over the emperor. An Imperial decree of 19 September 1622 gave the Jesuits supreme control over the entire school system of Bohemia, Moravia, and Silesia. The last four professors at the Carolinum resigned, and all of the Carolinum and nine colleges went to the Jesuits. The right of handing out degrees, of holding chancellorships, and of appointing the secular professors was also granted to the Jesuits.

Charles-Ferdinand University (1622–1882)
Cardinal Ernst Adalbert von Harrach actively opposed the union of the university with another institution, the withdrawal of the archiepiscopal right to the chancellorship, and prevented the drawing up of the Golden Bull for the confirmation of the grant to Jesuits. Cardinal Ernst funded the Collegium Adalbertinum, and in 1638, Emperor Ferdinand III limited the teaching monopoly enjoyed by the Jesuits. He took from them the rights, properties and archives of the Carolinum making the university once more independent under an imperial protector. During the last years of the Thirty Years' War the Charles Bridge in Prague was courageously defended by students of the Carolinum and Clementinum. Since 1650, those who received any degrees took an oath to maintain the Immaculate Conception of the Blessed Virgin, which has been renewed annually.

On 23 February 1654 emperor Ferdinand III merged Carolinum and Clementinum and created a single university with four faculties—Charles-Ferdinand University. Carolinum had at that time only the faculty of arts, as the only faculty surviving the period of the Hussite Wars. Starting at this time, the university designated itself Charles-Ferdinand University. The dilapidated Carolinum was rebuilt in 1718 at the expense of the state.

The rebuilding and the bureaucratic reforms of universities in the Habsburg monarchy in 1752 and 1754 deprived the university of many of its former privileges. In 1757 a Dominican and an Augustinian were appointed to give theological instruction. However, there was a gradual introduction of enlightened reforms, and this process culminated at the end of the century when even non-Catholics were granted the right to study. On 29 July 1784, German replaced Latin as the language of instruction. For the first time Protestants were allowed, and soon after Jews. The university acknowledged the need for a Czech language and literature chair. Emperor Leopold II established it by a courtly decree on 28 October 1791. On 15 May 1792, scholar and historian  was named the professor of the chair. He started his lectures on 13 March 1793.

In the revolution of 1848, German and Czech students fought for the addition of the Czech language at the Charles-Ferdinand University as a language of lectures. Due to the demographic changes of the 19th century, Prague ceased to have a German-language majority around 1860. By 1863, 22 lecture courses were held in Czech, the remainder (out of 187) in German. In 1864, Germans suggested the creation of a separate Czech university. Czech professors rejected this because they did not wish to lose the continuity of university traditions.

Split into Czech and German universities
It soon became clear that neither the German-speaking Bohemians nor the Czechs were satisfied with the bilingual arrangement that the university had established after the revolutions of 1848. The Czechs also refused to support the idea of the reinstitution of the 1349 student nations, instead declaring their support for the idea of keeping the university together, but dividing it into separate colleges, one German and one Czech. This would allow both Germans and Czechs to retain the collective traditions of the university. German-speakers, however, quickly vetoed this proposal, preferring a pure German university: they proposed to split Charles-Ferdinand University into two separate institutions.

After long negotiations, Charles-Ferdinand was divided into a German Charles-Ferdinand University and a Czech Charles-Ferdinand University by an act of the Cisleithanian Imperial Council, which Emperor Franz Joseph sanctioned on 28 February 1882. Each section was entirely independent of the other, and enjoyed equal status. The two universities shared medical and scientific institutes, the old insignia, aula, library, and botanical garden, but common facilities were administrated by the German University. The first rector of the Czech University became .

In 1890, the Royal and Imperial Czech Charles Ferdinand University had 112 teachers and 2,191 students and the Royal and Imperial German Charles Ferdinand University had 146 teachers and 1,483 students. Both universities had three faculties; the Theological Faculty remained the common until 1891, when it was divided as well. In the winter semester of 1909–10 the German Charles-Ferdinand University had 1,778 students; these were divided into: 58 theological students, for both the secular priesthood and religious orders; 755 law students; 376 medical; 589 philosophical. Among the students were about 80 women. The professors were divided as follows: theology, 7 regular professors, 1 assistant professor, 1 docent; law, 12 regular professors, 2 assistant professors, 4 docents; medicine, 15 regular professors, 19 assistant, 30 docents; philosophy, 30 regular professors, 8 assistant, 19 docents, 7 lecturers. The Czech Charles-Ferdinand University in the winter semester of 1909–10 included 4,319 students; of these 131 were theological students belonging both to the secular and regular clergy; 1,962 law students; 687 medical; 1,539 philosophical; 256 students were women. The professors were divided as follows: theological faculty, 8 regular professors, 2 docents; law, 12 regular, 7 assistant professors, 12 docents; medicine, 16 regular professors, 22 assistant, 24 docents; philosophy, 29 regular, 16 assistant, 35 docents, 11 lecturers.

The high point of the German University was the era preceding the First World War, when it was home to world-renowned scientists such as physicist and philosopher Ernst Mach, Moritz Winternitz and Albert Einstein. In addition, the German-language students included prominent individuals such as future writers Max Brod, Franz Kafka, and Johannes Urzidil. The "Lese- und Redehalle der deutschen Studenten in Prag" ("Reading and Lecture Hall of the German students in Prague"), founded in 1848, was an important social and scientific centre. Their library contained in 1885 more than 23,519 books and offered 248 scientific journals, 19 daily newspapers, 49 periodicals and 34 papers of entertainment. Regular lectures were held to scientific and political themes.

Even before the Austro-Hungarian Empire was abolished in late 1918, to be succeeded by Czechoslovakia, Czech politicians demanded that the insignia of 1348 were exclusively to be kept by the Czech university. The Act No. 197/1919 Sb. z. a n. established the Protestant Theological Faculty, but not as a part of the Charles University. (That changed on 10 May 1990, when it finally became a faculty of the university.)

In 1920, the so-called Lex Mareš (No. 135/1920 Sb. z. a n.) was issued, named for its initiator, professor of physiology František Mareš, which determined that the Czech university was to be the successor to the original university. Dropping the Habsburg name Ferdinand, it designated itself Charles University, while the German university was not named in the document, and then became officially called the German University in Prague.

In 1921 the German-speaking Bohemians considered moving their university to Liberec, in northern Bohemia. In 1930, about 42,000 inhabitants of Prague spoke German as their native language, while millions lived in northern, southern and western Bohemia, in Czech Silesia and parts of Moravia near the borders with Austria and Germany.

In October 1932, after Naegle's death, the Czechs started again a controversy over the insignia. Ethnic tensions intensified, although some professors of the German University were members of the Czechoslovak government. Any agreement to use the insignia for both the universities was rejected. On 21 November 1934, the German University had to hand over the insigniae to the Czechs. The German University senate sent a delegation to Minister of Education Krčmář to protest the writ. At noon on 24 November 1934, several thousand students of the Czech University protested in front of the German university building. The Czech rector Karel Domin gave a speech urging the crowd to attack, while the outnumbered German students tried to resist. Under the threat of violence, on 25 November 1934 rector  (1873–1951) handed over the insigniae. These troubles of 1934 harmed relations between the two universities and nationalities.

The tide turned in 1938 when, following the Munich Agreement, German troops entered the border areas of Czechoslovakia (the so-called Sudetenland), as did Polish and Hungarian troops elsewhere. On 15 March 1939 Germans forced Czecho-Slovakia to split apart and the Czech lands were occupied by Nazis as the Protectorate of Bohemia and Moravia. Reichsprotektor Konstantin von Neurath handed the historical insigniae to the German University, which was officially renamed Deutsche Karls-Universität in Prag. On 1 September 1939 the German University was subordinated to the Reich Ministry of Education in Berlin and on 4 November 1939 it was proclaimed to be Reichsuniversität.

On 28 October 1939, during a demonstration, Jan Opletal was shot. His burial on 15 November 1939 became another demonstration. On 17 November 1939 (now marked as International Students' Day) the Czech University and all other Czech institutions of higher learning were closed, remaining closed until the end of the War. Nine student leaders were executed and about 1,200 Czech students were interned in Sachsenhausen and not released until 1943. About 20 or 35 interned students died in the camp. On 8 May 1940 the Czech University was officially renamed Czech Charles University by government regulation 188/1940 Coll.

World War II marks the end of the coexistence of the two universities in Prague.

thumb|Detail of the stolen insignia of Charles University. From left: Sceptre of the Faculty of Theology, the Faculty of Law, the sceptre of the Rector, the sceptre of the Faculty of Medicine and the Faculty of Philosophy.

In 1945 the insignia of the university (the rector's chain, the scepters of the individual faculties, the university seal and also the founding documents and other historical documents) were stolen by the Nazis. None of these historical objects have been found to this day.

Present-day university (since 1945)

Although the university began to recover rapidly after 1945, it did not enjoy academic freedom for long. After the communist coup in 1948, the new regime started to arrange purges and repress all forms of disagreement with the official ideology, and continued to do so for the next four decades, with the second wave of purges during the "normalization" period in the beginning of the 1970s. Only in the late 1980s did the situation start to improve; students organized various activities and several peaceful demonstrations in the wake of the Revolutions of 1989 abroad. This initiated the "Velvet Revolution" in 1989, in which both students and faculty of the university played a large role. Václav Havel, a writer, dramatist and philosopher, was recruited from the independent academic community and appointed president of the republic in December 1989.

Location
Charles University does not have one joint campus. The academic facilities occupy many locations throughout the city of Prague and three of the faculties are located in other cities (two of them in Hradec Králové, one in Plzeň). The historical main building from the 14th century called Carolinum is situated in the Old Town of Prague and constitutes the university's center. It is the seat of the rector and of the Academic Senate of Charles university. Carolinum is also the venue for official academic ceremonies such as matriculations or graduations.

Its academic publishing house is Karolinum Press and the university also operates several museums. The Botanical Garden of Charles University, maintained by its Faculty of Science, is located in the New Town.

Organisation

Faculties 

Among the four original faculties of Charles University were: the faculty of law, medicine, art (philosophy) and theology (now catholic theology). Today, Charles University consists of 17 faculties, based primarily in Prague, two houses in Hradec Králové and one in Plzeň.
 Catholic Theological Faculty
 Protestant Theological Faculty
 Hussite Theological Faculty
 Faculty of Law
 First Faculty of Medicine
 Second Faculty of Medicine
 Third Faculty of Medicine
 Faculty of Medicine in Plzeň
 Faculty of Medicine in Hradec Králové
 Faculty of Pharmacy in Hradec Králové
 Faculty of Arts
 Faculty of Science
 Faculty of Mathematics and Physics
 Faculty of Education
 Faculty of Social Sciences
 Faculty of Physical Education and Sport
 Faculty of Humanities

Academic Institutes 
 Institute of the History of Charles University and Archive of Charles University
 Center for Theoretical Study
 Center for Economic Research and Graduate Education (CERGE-EI) together with Czech Academy of Sciences)
 Environment Center

Other units 
 Computer Science Centre
 Centre for Transfer of Knowledge and Technology
 Institute for Language and Preparatory Studies
 Central Library of Charles University
 Agency of the Council of Higher Education Institutions

Joint research centres of Charles University and the Czech Academy of Sciences 
 BIOCEV
 Centre for Biblical Studies
 Centre for Medieval Studies
 Center for Theoretical Study

Subsidiary companies 
 Charles University Innovations Prague (technology transfer office)
Charles Games (video game development and distribution)
LAM-X (nanomaterials development)
GeneSpector (development and distribution of kits for the diagnosis of COVID-19 and other viral agents)
FlexiCare (implementation of telerehabilitation systems)
GeneSpector Innovations (development and distribution of technologies for medical diagnostics)

There are also such programs as Egyptology (Czech Institute of Egyptology), Addictology and Criminology.

Rankings

According to Academic Ranking of World Universities (Shanghai Ranking), Charles University ranked in the upper 1.5 percent of the world's best universities in 2011. It came 201st to 300th out of 17,000 universities worldwide. It is the best university in the Czech Republic and one of the best universities in Central and Eastern Europe only overtaken by Russian Lomonosov Moscow State University at 74th place. It was placed 31st in Times BRICS & Emerging Economies Rankings 2014 (after 23rd University of Warsaw).

It was ranked in 2013 as 201–300 best in the World among 500 universities evaluated by Academic Ranking of World Universities (Shanghai Ranking), 233rd among 500 in QS World University Rankings, 351–400 among 400 universities in Times Higher Education World University Rankings and 485th in CWTS Leiden Ranking of 500 universities. Earlier rankings are presented in following table:

Rector of the University Václav Hampl said in 2008: "I am very pleased that Charles University achieved such a great success and I would like to thank to all who have contributed to it. An overwhelming majority of schools with a similar placement like Charles University have incomparably better financing and therefore this success is not only a reflection of professional qualities of our academics but also their personal efforts and dedication."

Subject rankings 
According to the QS Subject Ranking Charles University is among the 51–100 best universities in the world in geography and linguistics.

International cooperation
In Germany the Charles University in Prague cooperates with the Goethe-University in Frankfurt/Main. Both cities are linked by a long-lasting partnership agreement.

Notable faculty and students

Notable students

Notable academics

Leadership
 Since 26 January 2022, Prof. Milena Králíčková is the first woman rector of the Charles University.

See also
 CDE Podebrady
 International Students' Day
 List of Charles University rectors
 List of medieval universities
 Medieval university

Footnotes

References 

 F. Čapka: Dějiny zemí Koruny české v datech 
 KDO BYL KDO v našich dějinách do roku 1918 
 Digitální parlamentní knihovna 
 Historické senátní tisky 
  (with a lot of factual mistakes)
 Ludmila Hlaváčková: Německá lékařská fakulta v Praze (1883–1945) 
 17. listopad 1939 je opředen mýty, říká historik Petr Koura 
 Josef Chalupský: 17. listopad 1939 
 Littera fundationis Universitatis Carolinae Pragensis. 7. Aprilis 1348 
 Album, seu Matricula Facultatis juridicae, 1372–1418 
 History of Charles University DOC file with pictures
 Page about Johannes Urzidil 
 Official page of Collegium Carolinum
 Measuring Health and Disability in Europe 

 Hruška Emil, Nacisté a české poklady. Praha: Epocha, 2016. ISBN 978-80-7557-005-5.

Further reading
 Chad Bryant: Prague in Black. Nazi Rule and Czech Nationalism. Harvard Press
 : The Caroline University of Prague. A short history
 Peter Demetz: Prague in Black and Gold. Scenes from the Life of European City

External links

 
 Official history of CU (short)
 From the History of Charles University in Prague (timeline)
 Notes on the Founding Charter of Charles University, Prague, 7 April 1348
 A University Fit for a King – information about history and presence
 Albert Einstein's years in Prague
 Timeline of Ernst Mach's life
 Rise and fall of the German University Eye Clinic in Prague
 Universita Karlova od počátků husitství do Bílé hory (PDF) 
 Prager Professoren 1938–1948 
 Live and Study in the Czech republic 

 
Educational institutions in Prague
Educational institutions established in the 14th century
Universities in the Czech Republic
Charles University Faculty of Law (Prague, 1347)
1340s establishments in the Holy Roman Empire
1348 establishments in Europe
14th-century establishments in Bohemia